Dírná is a municipality and village in Tábor District in the South Bohemian Region of the Czech Republic. It has about 400 inhabitants.

Administrative parts
Villages of Lžín, Nová Ves, Záříčí and Závsí are administrative parts of Dírná.

References

External links

Villages in Tábor District